Willie Postler (born March 28, 1949) is a retired Canadian football player who played for the Hamilton Tiger-Cats, Edmonton Eskimos and BC Lions. He played college football at the University of Montana.

References

1949 births
Living people
Sportspeople from Vienna
Austrian players of Canadian football
Austrian players of American football
Montana Grizzlies football players
Edmonton Elks players